The Women's team kata competition at the 2022 European Karate Championships was held from 26 to 29 May 2022.

Results

Round 1

Round 2

Finals

References

External links
Draw

Women's team kata
2022 in women's karate